Pat McNamara (1938 – 2016) was an Irish politician who served as the mayor of Galway from 1982 to 1983.

Background 
A native of the Claddagh, McNamara worked for Connacth Mineral Company and played with Galway Rovers and Galway Town. He was elected to Galway Corporation in 1973 and was to spend the next seventeen years in politics. Elected Mayor in 1982, he visited one of the town's twins, Lorient, as well as Boston and Derry. He conferred the Freedom of Galway upon Paulo Evaristo Arns, the Archbishop of São Paulo.

McNamara died on 20 October 2016.

References

 Role of Honour: The Mayors of Galway City 1485-2001, William Henry, Galway 2001.

External links
 https://web.archive.org/web/20071119083053/http://www.galwaycity.ie/AllServices/YourCouncil/HistoryofTheCityCouncil/PreviousMayors/

Politicians from County Galway
Mayors of Galway
1938 births
Living people